Diamond Head is a 1962 Eastmancolor drama romance film starring Charlton Heston, Yvette Mimieux, George Chakiris, and James Darren, directed by Guy Green, and released by Columbia Pictures. The original music score was composed by John Williams, Hugo Winterhalter composed the theme, and Darren sang the title song. The soundtrack album was released by Colpix Records (CP 440). It was released on compact disc in 2006 by Film Score Monthly paired with Lalo Schifrin's Gone with the Wave

Silent film star Billie Dove makes her last film appearance in a brief cameo.

Plot summary
Richard "King" Howland is a swaggering land baron living on the Big Island of Hawaii. He objects when his sister, Sloan Howland, announces she plans to marry Paul Kahana, a native Hawaiian, though Richard is having a torrid affair with an Asian woman, Mai Chen. During Sloan and Paul's engagement party, Mai Chen's brother attacks Richard with a knife. Paul tries to break up the fight and is killed. Bitter at her brother for Paul's death, Sloan runs off to Honolulu, where she is taken in by Paul's brother, Dean, and his family.

Meanwhile, Mai Chen gives birth to Richard's child, but dies during childbirth. Richard refuses to accept the child, so Sloan takes it upon herself to care for the baby. After an angry fight with Sloan and Dean, Richard is confronted with a personal dilemma—whether to continue on with his close-minded ways or to welcome his newborn son into his family.

Although the story is based on the novel by Peter Gilman, the screenplay by Marguerite Roberts makes several significant changes in Gilman's story. Several characters are eliminated, including Richard's father, Richard's wife, and his hapa haole (half-Hawaiian/half white) half-brother. Roberts also changed the ending of the story.

Main cast

Production
Clark Gable was originally slated for Heston's role but died before production began.

See also
List of American films of 1962

References

External links
 
 
 
 

1960s English-language films
1962 romantic drama films
Films scored by John Williams
Films based on American novels
Films based on romance novels
Columbia Pictures films
Films directed by Guy Green
Films set in Hawaii
American romantic drama films
1960s American films